is a railway station of Kyushu Railway Company located in Minami-ku, Kumamoto, Japan.

The station was used as a filming location for the 2011 film "I Wish" (Kiseki) by the Japanese director Hirokazu Koreeda.

Railway stations in Kumamoto Prefecture
Railway stations in Japan opened in 1894